Freeman Cobb (10 October 1830 – 24 May 1878) was an American, born in Brewster, Massachusetts, who established the Cobb & Co stagecoach company in 1853, with partners John Murray Peck, James Scanlon and John B. Lamber. The company was based in Melbourne, Victoria, Australia, and used Concord coaches, imported from America, to provide services to and from the Victorian goldfields.

Cobb returned to the United States after three and a half years but associates continued operating as Cobb & Co. He had built a brand so strong that companies with that name operated until 1924.

In 1871, Cobb took his family to South Africa to establish a Cobb & Co Ltd stagecoach service with Charles Cole, who had operated Cobb & Co coaches in New Zealand and Japan. The new company started operating between Port Elizabeth and the new diamond fields at Kimberley. Cobb died at Port Elizabeth in 1878.

In popular culture
Cobb was the model for "Chris Cobb", lead character of the Australian TV series Whiplash, which premiered on Channel Seven on 18 February 1961, and starred Peter Graves as Cobb.

References

1830 births
1878 deaths
American transportation businesspeople
19th-century Australian businesspeople
19th-century American businesspeople